These are the official results of the Women's 3000 metres event at the 1993 World Championships in Athletics in Stuttgart, Germany. There were a total number of 47 participating athletes, with three qualifying heats and the final held on Monday 16 August 1993.

Final

Qualifying heats
Held on Saturday 1993-08-14

See also
 1988 Women's Olympic 3000 metres (Seoul)
 1990 Women's European Championships 3000 metres (Split)
 1992 Women's Olympic 3000 metres (Barcelona)
 1994 Women's European Championships 3000 metres (Helsinki)
 1996 Women's Olympic 5000 metres (Atlanta)

References
 Results

3000 metres
1993 in women's athletics